Established in 1925, the Ministry of Justice of the Republic of Tajikistan is the executive body implementing the state policy and normative legal regulation in the sphere of legal aid to the citizens, promotion of legal and criminal justice, and judicial and criminal prosecutions. The ministry also works with other justice ministries around the world to prosecute criminals.

History 
In 1924, the People's Commissariat of Justice of the Republic of Tajikistan was established by the Tajik Autonomous Soviet Socialist Republic. By the decree of the Council of People's Commissars of the USSR, the Commissariat was given official instructions and tasks on 12 February 1925. On 7 July 1925, the decision of interdepartmental training for administrative staff of the judiciary began by order of the Communist Party of Tajikistan's Central Committee under the auspices of the People's Commissariat for Education (commonly known as the Ministry of Education). As a result of the effective execution of the Commissariat of Justice, neighboring Soviet republics were established their own justice departments. The Tajik People's Commissariat of Justice worked as a branch of the Supreme Soviet of the Uzbek SSR which had supremacy over laws in has worked in the Tajik SSR since 1927, then founded on the basis of the Tajik SSR.

On 20 June 1933, the decision was taken by the Prosecutor's Office to create a separate and independent public prosecutor's office timed for the formation of the Tajik Soviet Socialist Republic (Tajik SSR). The establishment of the Tajik SSR Prosecutor's office has been the task of observing the observance of the law and has been subjected to the right of the people's justice commission. In 1946, the decision of the Tajik SSR's Council of Ministers, its name was changed to the Ministry of Justice of the Tajik SSR. The Ministry of Justice operated at this level until 24 November 1958 replaced it with a legal commission under the Council of Ministers. Furthermore, most of the tasks previously implemented by the ministry were handed over to the Supreme Court of the Tajik SSR, including the inspection and supervision of the activities of the civil courts. After the independence of Tajikistan occurred in 1991, with the aim of ensuring judicial and independent judicial reform in the newly established Republic of Tajikistan. It was first established as the Council of Justice in December 1999 under the Ministry of Internal Affairs. Ministerial status was granted in 2008.

List of ministers 
 T. Saifiddinov (1925–1927)
 M. Negmatulloev (1927)
 M. Sadulloev (1927–1931)
 S. Hojiyarov (1931–1933)
 C. Imomov (1933–1935)
 N. Shirinov (1935–1936)
 R. Mahkamov (1936–1937)
 Z. Sharifov (1939–1940)
 M. Rajabekov (1941–1951)
 H. Nazarov (1952–1959)
 M. Ismailov (1959–1970)
 S. Rajabov (1970–1978)
 S. Mahmudov (1978–1990)
 F. Abdulloev (1990–1993)
 Shavkat Ismailov (1993–2001)
 Halifabobo Hamidov (2001–2006)
 Bakhtiyor Khudoyorov (2006–2012)
 R. Mengliev (2012–2013)
 Rustam Shoemurod (2013–present)

Structure
Central Office
Department of Legislation
Department of International Legal Relations
Department of State Accounting and Registration
Department of Legal Assistance to Citizens for Legal Affairs
Department of State Registration of Public Organizations and Political Parties
Department of Organization of the Activity of Bailiffs
Department of Personnel and Special Affairs
Department of Finance and Economics
General and Execution Control Department
Department of State Registration of Mortgage Obligations
Household Sector
Main Department for the Execution of Criminal Punishments
Military Unit 6593
GBAO and Oblast Justice Departments
Main State Notary Office of the Republic of Tajikistan
GBAO Notary Offices
Regional Notary Offices
City Notary Offices
District Notary Offices
Department of Civil Status Documents
Republican Center of Forensic Science

Institutions and enterprises
Institute for Advanced Training of Employees of Justice and Legal Services
State Unitary Enterprise "Legislation"

See also 
Justice ministry
Ministry of Health (Tajikistan)
Ministry of Internal Affairs (Tajikistan)
Politics of Tajikistan

References 

Government of Tajikistan
Government ministries of Tajikistan
Justice ministries
Ministries established in 1925
1925 establishments in the Soviet Union